State Road 1 (SR 1) is a north–south state highway in eastern Indiana, consisting of two segments. Its southern segment begins at U.S. Highway 50 and Interstate 275 in east-central Dearborn County, just east of Lawrenceburg, and ends at Interstate 469 south of Fort Wayne.

Route description

Southern section

State Road 1 begins at an interchange of Interstate 275; this is I-275's only exit in Indiana. Just after the interchange there is a stop light at U.S. Route 50 (US 50). SR 1 continues north until it meets U.S. Route 52 (US 52) just west of Cedar Grove. Then US 52 and SR 1 continue north-northeast for  until they reach Brookville; here, US 52 turns west on its way to Indianapolis, while SR 1 continues north-northwest for  where it meets Indiana State Road 44 (SR 44). SR 1 and SR 44 travel together for  where SR 1 turns north-northeast towards downtown Connersville. North of Connersville, SR 1 travels north-northwest until it reaches Cambridge City, where SR 1 crosses U.S. Route 40 (US 40). After the intersection at US 40, SR 1 heads north-northeast. After  SR 1 has an interchange with Interstate 70 (I-70), then heads due north towards U.S. Route 36 (US 36). Just south of Fort Wayne, SR 1 ends at an interchange with Interstate 469 (I-469).

Northern section
On the north side of Fort Wayne at the Dupont Road interchange of Interstate 69 (I-69), the northern section of SR 1 begins and heads east.  The road heads away from I–69 as a six-lane divided highway, along the south edge of the Parkview Regional Medical Center complex, passing through numerous commercial properties. The highway narrows to a four-lane divided highway at Diebold Road and then enters an area of mixed commercial and residential properties. At Tonkel Road, SR 1 begins to curve northeast toward Leo and narrows to a two-lane highway. The route then leaves Fort Wayne, passing through rural farm land with scattered houses. Curving due north to enter Leo on Main Street, SR 1 then passes through residential areas of that town. North of downtown Leo the highway curves northeast and passes through a mix of commercial and residential properties. As the road enters DeKalb County it curves to run due north. The highway then enters Spencerville, passing through the center of town.  After Spencerville, the road curves northeast, before again turning back north. The highway enters St. Joe and takes a sharp curve to head due east. The route crosses CSX Railroad tracks and makes another sharp curve heading due north. The road continues north until it meets SR 8. The two routes head east-southeast for a  concurrency, until SR 1 departs the joint section heading due north.  The road then passes through rural farmland, with a few houses, as a two-lane highway. Upon entering Butler it crosses the Norfolk Southern Railroad tracks, before encountering a signalized intersection with US 6 in downtown Butler.  SR 1 then leaves Butler heading due north until it intersects DeKalb County Road 46, at which point the highway turns northwest. The route enter Hamilton and begins a concurrency with SR 427, heading northeast and passing Hamilton Lake. After , SR 1 leaves the concurrency heading due north. The highway then continues in that direction until reaching its northern terminus at US 20.

History

Lawrenceburg

SR 1 began at US 50 and Main Street in Lawrenceburg and traveled north on Main Street until Main Street became Ridge Avenue. It then followed Ridge Avenue until it met the current SR 1.

Bluffton to Fort Wayne
Between the late 1940s and late 1950s, SR 1 had three or more lanes. This started in Bluffton and continued north to Fort Wayne.

Fort Wayne
Before being split into two sections on either side of Fort Wayne, SR 1 traveled on a continuous route through that city. From the present northern terminus of its southern section at Interstate 469's exit 6 in south-central Allen County, it continued north on Bluffton Road to pass just east of Fort Wayne's main airport (then known as Baer Field). In the Waynedale district of southwestern Fort Wayne, SR 3 joined Bluffton Road from the southwest at Lower Huntington Road. From there the routes originally continued together northward, hugging the bank of the St. Mary's River before curving east to bridge it. SR 1/SR 3 then immediately turned right (south) onto Broadway for about  before turning east on Rudisill Boulevard. From there the routes continued to a one way pair of Clinton Street (southbound) and Lafayette Street (northbound), which then carried a concurrency of US 27 from Decatur and US 33 from St. Marys, Ohio. At Lima Road, SR 3 continues north, as US 27 and SR 1 got on I-69 northbound until exiting at Dupont Road.

In later years, after the decommissioning of SR 3 through Fort Wayne and the completion of the Baer Field Thruway (later renamed Airport Expressway), SR 1 was rerouted to turn right onto that roadway, which deposited motorists onto Paulding Road at Fairfield Avenue. From there SR 1 headed east along Paulding Road to its intersection with US 27/US 33 (now Lafayette Street), where it turned left (north) and joined those routes to downtown Fort Wayne.

North of Rudisill Boulevard, the original concurrency of US 27/US 33/SR 1/SR 3 (as well as the later concurrency of the first 3 routes) followed the Lafayette Street/Clinton Street pair to downtown Fort Wayne, where US 33 departed to the west. North of downtown, Lafayette Street became Spy Run Boulevard (still one-way northbound) until it terminated at the north end of the one-way pair with Clinton Street. From there the three (later two) combined routes continued north for a few blocks on Clinton Street to Northrup Street, where they curved northwest onto the latter roadway. Just south of Coliseum Boulevard SR 930 (then U.S. 30), Northrup Street becomes Lima Road, and continues north-northwest to I-69.
At that point, SR 3 continued (later resumed) northbound on Lima Road to Kendallville, and US 27 and SR 1 both entered I-69 northbound, with SR 1 concurrent with the freeway until the Dupont Road interchange and US 27 concurrent with I-69 into Michigan.

Steuben County
At one point, the northern terminus was at SR 120 just west of the Ohio State Line.

Major intersections

See also

 List of state roads in Indiana
 List of highways numbered 1

References

External links

 Indiana Highway Ends - State Road 1

001
Transportation in Fort Wayne, Indiana
Transportation in Dearborn County, Indiana
Transportation in Franklin County, Indiana
Transportation in Wayne County, Indiana
Transportation in Randolph County, Indiana
Transportation in Jay County, Indiana
Transportation in Wells County, Indiana
Transportation in Allen County, Indiana
Transportation in DeKalb County, Indiana
Transportation in Steuben County, Indiana